Planodes ambonensis is a species of beetle in the family Cerambycidae. It was described by Stephan von Breuning and Chûjô in 1965.

References

ambonensis
Beetles described in 1965